Susan L. Nigro (born 1951) is an American contrabassoonist. Unlike most players of the instrument, Nigro's career is primarily as a solo recitalist and recording artist rather than an orchestral player.

Life
Nigro, a native of Chicago, she graduated from Northwestern University, with a bachelor's and master's degree, and from Roosevelt University. Her instructors included Burl Lane and Wilbur Simpson. She is a member of several high-IQ societies, including Mensa and Intertel.

Career
She includes works in her repertoire such works as  the Gunther Schuller and Daniel Dorff concertos for contrabassoon, as well as the Stamitz and Mozart concertos originally written for the bassoon. Nigro has premiered over 30 works since 1988, most of which were commissioned by her.  She has given more premieres than any other contra bassoonist.

She has appeared as a soloist with such groups as the Chicago Chamber Orchestra, Rome Festival Orchestra, and the Mozarteum Orchestra of Salzburg, as well as at multiple conferences of the International Double Reed Society, and performed as a recitalist and given masterclasses at dozens of universities and music festivals.

In addition to her recording and recital careers, Nigro has been the full-time substitute for the Chicago Symphony Orchestra during the 2005–2006 season and again during the seasons 2008-2010.  She is also a guest artist with the Northwest Symphony. She was among the founders of the Chicago Bassoon Quartet and The Two Contras, the latter a contrabassoon duet.

She won a Pro Music International Career Development Grant, and Illinois Arts Council grant.

Recordings
The Big Bassoon
Little Tunes for the Big Bassoon
The 2 Contras, with Burl Lane
The Bass Nightingale, GM 2069
New Tunes for the Big Bassoon
Bellissima: Italian Tunes for the Big Bassoon
Original Tunes for the Big Bassoon
Scott Joplin Rags for the Big Bassoon

References

External links
Susan Nigro's website
Susan Nigro interview by Bruce Duffie

Living people
1951 births
Musicians from Chicago
American classical bassoonists

Mensans